The Julius J. Martens Company Building is a specialty store in Kaukauna, Wisconsin, United States. Previously, the building has been used as a department store. It was added to the National Register of Historic Places in 1984 for its significance in commerce and agriculture.

References

Commercial buildings completed in 1901
Commercial buildings on the National Register of Historic Places in Wisconsin
Department stores on the National Register of Historic Places
National Register of Historic Places in Outagamie County, Wisconsin